Louis Krüger (born 5 June 1996 in Pankow) is a German teacher and politician from Alliance 90/The Greens. He was elected to the Abgeordnetenhaus of Berlin in Pankow 5 at the 2021 Berlin state election. He is the second youngest member of the 19th Abgeordnetenhaus of Berlin. Krüger is the school policy spokesman for the Greens in the House of Representatives and a member of the Committee on Education, Youth and Family.

References 

1996 births
Living people
21st-century German politicians
Alliance 90/The Greens politicians
Members of the Abgeordnetenhaus of Berlin

People from Pankow